Fırat University Faculty of Veterinary Medicine is among the few faculties that have achieved full accreditation by EAEVE in Turkey. Fırat University Faculty of Veterinary Medicine was created in 1970.

Section

Division of Basic Sciences 
 Department of Anatomy
 Department of Histology & Embryology
 Department of Physiology
 Department of Biochemistry
 Department of Veterinary Medicine History & Deontology

Division of Preclinical Sciences 
 Department of Pharmacology and Toxicology
 Department of Microbiology
 Department of Parasitology
 Department of Pathology
 Department of Virology

Division of Clinical Sciences 
 Department of Surgery
 Department of Obstetrics and Gynecology
 Department of Internal Medicine
 Department of Reproduction and Artificial Insemination

Division of Animal Husbandry and Animal Nutrition 
 Department of Biostatistics
 Department of Genetics
 Department of Animal Nutrition and Nutritional Diseases
 Department of Livestock Economics
 Department of Animal Husbandry

Division of Food Hygiene and Technology 
 Department of Food Hygiene and Technology

Fırat University
Veterinary schools in Turkey